An electric vehicle charging network is an infrastructure system of charging stations to recharge electric vehicles. Many government, car manufacturers, and charging infrastructure providers sought to create networks.  the largest fast-charging location was in California on the Tesla Supercharger network, with 56 charging stalls. Today, charging network vendors include either proprietary solutions (ex. Tesla or Chargepoint), or hardware agnostic solutions (ex. AmpUp, EVConnect, and Shell Recharge). Hardware-agnostic vendors allow for customers to switch out their charge stations and/or switch to a different network vendors (similar to an unlocked smartphone); whereas proprietary vendors do not allow for customers to switch.

Maps
The Go Electric Stations is a global station navigation system. The project currently includes free smartphone apps via Next Charge and provides free data and information to users and providers regarding stations all around the world. Station activation from the tap of a smartphone and real time availability information can be discovered along with a detailed payment option system and navigational routing maps. The website also offers an exclusive PlugShare program which allows users to share their plug with fellow EV owners.

The PlugSurfing community is a community based charging station locator. PlugSurfing is merging static and realtime availability charging station information and crowd sources information through mobile apps and other devices. This way PlugSurfing responds to the needs of the electric driver.

The OpenChargeMap project is an open source database with a public API for sharing and distributing charging location information globally. Information in this system is gathered both manually and automatically from a variety of data sources. The project aims to provide globally relevant data freely to other application developers and navigation providers.

The EV Charger Maps website is a volunteer-run effort coordinated by EV Charger News that catalogs EV charging station information across the U.S.  It contains information targeted for real-world use by electric vehicle owners.

The LEMnet internet database is operated by Park & Charge. The database not only provides locations of the Park & Charge stations but also everyone is free to register their stations. As of August 2011 the database lists more than 3100 active charging locations in Europe. This includes some of the 190 locations (March 2011) of the Drehstromnetz initiative which is specialized on privately owned 400 V 3-phase charging stations (German "Drehstromnetz" means "3-phase network") and the 200 (May 2010) charging stations of the RWE Mobility infrastructure which also offers 400 V 3-phase charging. The LEMnet database does not include all of the 2500 charging stations (March 2010) listed in the ElektroTankstellen internet database operated by the Austrian "Eurosolar" initiative even that there is some overlap in data. All of them offer KMZ map files and POI collection files for navigation systems enhanced with information required for electric vehicle owners to find a public charging point in Europe.

In Spain Alargador offers an editable map of EV recharge points in which everybody who wants to share their electric outlet can do it easily. All data is downloadable freely to most common GPS navigators and mapping software. Another source is ElectroMaps to find a station in Spain.

Pod Point provides one of the UK's largest public charging networks with over 1,500 stations. The live charging station map provides the address, charging rate, connector type and availability of public charging stations. In 2015, they launched the Open Charge public network with smartphone-enabled charging points that are reliable and easy to use.

PlugShare is a crowdsourced map of public, private and residential charging locations. The site uses Google Maps to provide a map of charging locations and their own database to filter by charging type. Public chargers, private chargers, and residential charging locations are listed. The service provides an app for iOS and Android which allows users to locate chargers near their current location. An account is needed to view private persons' charging locations, as these locations are at the homes or businesses of Plugshare members. Plugshare was acquired by EVgo in 2021. Plugshare is one of many leading sources of where charge stations exist, however plenty public and private stations are not updated in the app.

Sun Country Highway includes a map of 1000 of its chargers across Canada and the US.

Naladuj website is a search engine and map containing charging stations located in Poland. It allows to perform search based on a given place and/or selected categories including connector type, charging speed/power, availability, opening hours, payment/authorization requirements and voivodeship. To locate charging stations cataloged in the database, depending on the user's choice, Naladuj uses Google Maps or OpenStreetMap.

EVhype provides an interactive map of electric vehicle public charging stations. It uses various sources to obtain and display charging stations the data. EVhype has a social network element. It allows users to create accounts, add comments, bookmarks and pictures.

Infrastructure providers
Advanced Energy, in partnership with Rocky Mountain Institute has announced a Request for Information (RFI) for EVSE specific to charging stations for plug-in electric vehicles (EV).
AmpUp is a leading EV charging network provider in the United States that allows station owners to manage their chargers' availability, price, electric load, and more. AmpUp's solutions are tailored to workplaces, fleets, utilities, and multi-unit dwellings. The company also offers a mobile app so EV drivers can find, authenticate, and pay for EV charging at stations near them.
ChargePoint, formerly Coulomb Technologies, includes public charging stations, a consumer subscription plan and utility grid management technology to help electric utility companies to smooth electrical demands on the grid. As of 2012, Coulomb Technologies' ChargePoint network consisted of 6,500 locations in 14 countries. As of 2009, the ChargePoint network didn't include battery swap stations.
Connected Kerb is a UK-based provider of electric vehicle charging infrastructure, founded in 2017, which aims to make EV charging affordable, sustainable and accessible for all regardless of social status, location or physical ability. In November 2021, the company announced plans to install 190,000 on-street residential charging points across the UK by 2030 to help EV users without access to home charging facilities.  The CEO is Chris Pateman-Jones.
DC America
Ecotricity is a UK-based energy company who offer rapid charging points at motorway service stations and other locations across the UK. The electricity they provide is grid-matched with renewable generation. The company has partnerships with Renault–Nissan Alliance, who provided many of the rapid chargers.
Elektromotive was a UK-based company that manufactured and installed charging infrastructure for electric cars and other electric vehicles using their patented Elektrobay stations. The company has partnerships with major corporations including EDF Energy and Mercedes-Benz to supply charging posts and data services. They have since been absorbed into Chargemaster, now BP Pulse.
Electrify America is a DC fast charging station network based only in the United States with approximately 730 charging locations as of March 2022, the company was created by the Volkswagen Group after the United States EPA accused them of using defeat devices in its diesel-fueled vehicles.
EV Connect
EVgo
EVDC is a Puerto Rico-based company that aims to build its supercharger network nationwide.
Francis Energy
FullCharger International, founded in 2009, is a French operator of charging stations for electric vehicles with multi-territorial networks. They offer local authorities and private operators complete solutions for electric mobility. FullCharger ChargePoint Network is the world's largest network across 23 countries. FullCharger's target is to pioneer and be the main solution provider in building and operating a multi-territorial smart network of the most advanced, secure, easy to use electric vehicle charging infrastructure, through a unique approach bringing added value to public authorities, private sector and EV drivers.
Hubsta - Is a UK-based facility for EV users and claims to facilitate 'connecting to over 55,000 Charge points worldwide' and 'its never been easier to charge your EV or manage your EV charging Network'.
Instavolt is a Hampshire-based UK charging network which installs, operates and owns rapid EV charging stations. 
Osprey provides EV charging across the UK. The network was founded in 2016 as Engenie Electric Vehicle Rapid Charging and in 2020 the name was replaced with Osprey Charging Network.
Park & Charge is a European Charging infrastructure for electric vehicles. Park & Charge was founded in 1992 by members of the electric car club in Switzerland (ECS). Today there is a Park & Charge at nearly 500 locations in Switzerland, Germany, Austria, the Netherlands and Italy, offering a safe and easy way for drivers of electric vehicles to charge their vehicle batteries. The locations of the charging stations in Europe will be published in LEMnet internet database which is operated by Park & Charge.
Share&Charge is a Germany-based peer to peer network aimed at the sharing of private charging poles in order to make them accessible to everyone as well as billable. The peer to peer network comes in an App which includes a map of existing charging poles, the possibility to easily register a private charging pole as well as the handling of the payment by Share&Charge. Share&Charge Website
Shell Recharge Solutions
Spark Plug Chargers
Volta Charging is an American charging infrastructure company. Their charging stations are compatible with all major plug-in hybrid and battery electric vehicle types in the United States. Volta is supported by advertisements and generally provides charging for free.
ZEF Energy
Zest is an EV charging network operating across the UK. Backed by the UK Government’s Charging Infrastructure Investment Fund, it offers a managed service for EV charging.

Automobile manufacturers 
The Renault–Nissan Alliance has made agreements to promote emission-free mobility in France, Israel, Portugal, Denmark and the U.S. state of Tennessee.
Nissan plans to install 200-volt level 2 charging stations at 2,200 Nissan dealers in Japan, and level 3 fast charging stations at 200 dealers.

Tesla Motors, in March 2009, announced that they are "working with a government-affiliated partner to set up battery changing stations at various locations" to service their Model S platform cars. The first were unveiled 24 September 2012.  As of Q4 2021, Tesla reported 3,476 supercharging stations and 31,498 supercharging connectors (about 9 connectors per station on average) in 44 countries worldwide.

Initiatives by region

Europe
The AVERE / European Association for Battery, Hybrid and Fuel Cell Electric Vehicles was founded back in 1978 and is a member of the World Electric Vehicle Association. AVERE is also the parent organization of CITELEC / Association of European Cities interested in Electric Vehicles and Eurelectric. The European Commission has funded the "Green Cars Initiative" since November 2008. In March 2011, the European Commission along with forty two partners from the industries, utilities, electric car manufacturers, municipalities, universities and technology and research institutions founded the "Green eMotion" initiative funded with €41.8 million under the Seventh Research and Development Framework Programme. The defined goal is to provide an interoperable electromobility framework to align the ongoing regional and national electromobility initiatives. At the same time the partners unveiled the "Transport 2050" plan which includes the aim to half the number of conventionally fuelled cars in cities by 2030 and phase them out by 2050.

In the second position paper (March 2011) of the European Automobile Manufacturers Association it is recommended to equip public charging stations with IEC 62196 Type 2 Mode 3 connectors with transitional solutions to be allowed up to 2017. Nevertheless, multiple socket types (IEC 60309-2 Mode 2 types, IEC 62196 Mode 3 types, Chademo and standard home socket outlets Mode 2) have been deployed already. Politics have called for single European-wide standard and in case of a market failure the EU will define the infrastructure side requirements by law in 2013. As expected from lobbying the European Commission has proposed in January 2013 to only use the Type 2 connector type as the single standard to end prior uncertainty about the charging station equipment in Europe. Common standards for electric charging points across Europe must be designed and implemented by December 2015.

Czech Republic

Power supplier ČEZ has announced to have 50 recharging stations to be ready by the end of 2011. By June 2012 the company had 14 public and 6 private charging stations installed with more to come in Mlada Boleslav at the Skoda facilities. These charging stations use a combination of 230 V mains connector (Type E) at 16 A and a 400 V three-phase Mennekes connector (Type 2) at 16 A or 32 A.

Denmark / Norway

There are 2 major charge point operators in Denmark, E.on are operating mostly fast chargers, only installing rapids at freeways, while Clever is installing both fast and rapids in city centers.

Both E.on and Clever is taking part in installing rapid chargers at freeway lay-bys, with Clever installing 4 of them and E.on a total of 20 at 10 different locations.

Besides E.on and Clever, local energy companies are installing free-to-use charge points, often only consisting of a CEE plug, so the users have to bring their own EVSE box.

Infrastructure was planned by Better Place and has been installed by Coulomb Technologies for Copenhagen. Denmark has enacted policies that create a tax differential between zero-emission vehicles and traditional cars to accelerate the transition to electric cars. Better Place had announced the network to be complete in December 2012, however the stations and chargers have been switched off due to the bankruptcy of Better Place Danmark A/S in June 2013. By April 2013 the network had consisted of 700 public charging spots, 18 battery switch stations and 8 fast charger stations.

In 2013 E.on bought the charge points from Better Place and restarted the network, without the battery swap system.

Norway has a tradition in building electric vehicles based on the Think Car. It is popular in Southern Norway (Oslo), Southern Sweden (Gothenburg) and Eastern Denmark (Copenhagen). The concept of the  "Move About" project will provide 60 new Think cars in a test including charging stations in 50 towns in the area until 2013. The MoveAbout concept is actually derived from a car sharing system where cars are not offered for purchase but for leasing.

Estonia
The Estonian network has the highest concentration of DC chargers in Europe.

The Estonian government and Kredex launched the charging station network project in 2011 in cooperation with ABB, funded partially by the Mitsubishi Corporation. The nationwide electric car charging network officially opened with 165 fast chargers on 20 February 2013. These chargers were installed in all urban settlements with more than 5,000 inhabitants. That makes it possible to reach every point within the country without a supply interruption. All of the Terra 51 CHAdeMO-type DC chargers are fast-charging, only needing between 15 and 30 minutes to fully charge a car's battery.

France

In France, Électricité de France (EDF) and Toyota are installing recharging points for PHEVs on roads, streets and parking lots.

The Renault–Nissan Alliance and the largest French electric utility, Electricite de France (EDF) have signed an agreement to promote emission-free mobility in France. The move aims at offering all-electric volume vehicles from 2011 — including a countrywide network of battery charging stations. The partner Vinci Autoroutes has announced to rebuild 738 car parks along motorways with at least 5 parking lots for charging electric vehicles – construction will start at the end of 2011 and the full extent will be reached in 2013.

The Environment Ministry of France, led by Jean-Louis Borloo has announced the goal to install 400,000 charging points in France by 2015. Jean-Louis Borloo has assigned 1.5 billion Euros in 2009 to support research and preparations for the first part of the electric vehicle network with 75,000 charging stations.

Meanwhile, the pilot project in Paris has started with the introduction of 100 Z.E. cars. The map of charging stations can be downloaded from the city website. There are 101 locations with 178 charging points across the town and its suburbs (May 2010). The charging points have either Schuko-like sockets (Type E / 2P+T) or a Marechal plug on spiral cord where both variants are rated at 230 V/16 A (mains).

Schneider Electric supports test drives in France with its charging stations that include a Type 3 (EV Plug Alliance) connector. In Strasbourg 100 Toyota Prius were tested with 135 recharging spots beginning Q1 2010 (Type 3 single-phase). In the suburbs of Paris there will be 300 recharging spots to be installed in Q1 2011. In the "Projet Klébér" the Strasbourg vehicle fleet may use the charging stations of EnBW in Mannheim, Karlsruhe, Stuttgart and vice versa. In Yvelines near Paris the fleet test SAVE (Seine Aval Véhicule Électrique) was started in April 2011 – until September 2011 a number of 200 charging stations will be built.

The Monaco government has sketched a plan to run a fleet test in 2011 including 300 charging stations and 3 fast-charge stations.

Italy

The Renault–Nissan group – including EDF – has enlarged its scope with partnering to the Italian utility Enel and Spanish utility Endesa in March 2010. Renault–Nissan offers a broader range by providing 60 all-electric vehicles – the Kangoo Express Z.E. and the Renault Fluence Z.E – to the new pilot project "E-Moving" in Italy. The project will start to install 270 charge points in the Lombardy region (including the cities of Milan and Brescia) up to June 2010. This "E-Moving" network will contain 150 public charging stations to be put up until the end of 2010.

The Italian Enel company had an early agreement with Daimler to run a test with their Smart line of cars. Enel has started the "emobility Italy" program in cooperation with Daimler in 2008 – this program will put up 400 public and private charging stations in Rome, Milan and Pisa with charging stations to be built since September 2010. The project was supposed to start in 2011 with a test run going for 48 months – since 5. April 2012 the Smart drive E-Mobility program is ready. The 100 public charging stations in Rome are built with a three-phase Type 2 Mennekes connector while the additional 50 home charging stations are built with a single-phase Type 3 Scame connector.

The E-Move charging stations around Bolzano allow for a test drive of connecting solar panels directly to light vehicles for charging.

The Zero Emission City Parma is a regional project with a 9 million Euro funding to create 300 charging stations along with 900 electric vehicles until 2015.  The project is expected to go fully operational by the end of 2012, with 300 points of charge installed and 400/450 electric vehicles circulating.

Germany

Germany has four major transmission system operators (50Hertz, Amprion, TenneT, TransnetBW). They try to set themselves into the position to sell electricity power to electric vehicle owners by becoming also the operators of the upcoming electric vehicle networks. To that avail, they offered partnerships to the German car makers, where they provided charging stations for field tests.

Carmaker Daimler AG and utility RWE AG are running a joint electric car and charging station test project in the German capital, Berlin, called "E-Mobility Berlin.". They have set up 60 charging stations in Berlin (September 2009) and are in the process of extending the system to include 500 charging stations. Daimler has provided for 100 Smart electric drive cars to the project. The second phase started in November 2010. The RWE subsidiary "RWE Mobility" has created cooperations with the automobilist club ADAC, car rental service Sixt and car park provider APCOA to equip all locations with charging stations. since mid of 2009. Renault joined the RWE Mobility program in September 2009 whereby the project goals of erecting charging stations were enlarged to mid of 2011 Renault's partner Nissan has joined the RWE-mobility program on 21. June 2010 announcing that RWE will create a network of 1000 charging stations until the end of the year 2010 focusing on the Berlin and Rhein-Ruhr region. On 28. August a cooperation with fuel retailer PKN Orlen (owning 2700 gasoline stations in Poland, Czech Republic and Germany) was announced – they are starting to equip 30 gasoline stations in Hamburg with charging points for electric vehicles. The current list of RWE-mobility charging stations contains 500 locations in Germany, 50 locations in the Netherlands, 11 in Poland and Austria plus a few stations in other neighbouring countries – also RWE has switched all of its charging stations to Type 2 sockets.

Carmaker BMW and utility Vattenfall run a joint electric car and charging test project called "MINI E" in the German capital, Berlin. They are in the process of erecting 50 charging stations and the project lends 50 BMW Mini cars to citizens. The project started in June 2009 and a second phase has been started in December 2009. Up to June 2011 there were 42 public charge points by Vattenfall in Berlin and the company is in the process of building 50 public charge points in Hamburg. While the earliest charging stations were using CEEplus sockets the newer charging stations are built to Type 2 Mode 3 sockets.

Carmaker VW and utility E.ON run a joint electric car and charging station test project in the German capital, Berlin and in Wolfsburg. The "Electric Mobility Fleet Test" was started as a research project with mostly partners in German universities using the VW hybrid cars (to be tested in 2010). E.ON has later joined also in the MINI E project providing the infrastructure in Munich which was started in Juli 2009. erecting an initial series of 11 charging stations (May 2010) enlarging it continuously (21 locations in December 2010). The region test in Munich has been extended by BMW i3 and BMW i8 prototypes (project i) as well as Audi e-tron models (project eflott) in 2011. E.ON has announced to provide the eflott project with 200 public charging stations the Munich region.

Carmaker Daimler, the utility EnBW and the government of Baden-Württemberg have announced on 18. June 2010 to enlarge the "Landesinitiative Elektromobilität" program with the "e-mobility Baden-Württemberg" project that includes erecting 700 charging stations in the state until the end of 2011. Additionally there will be 200 electric vehicles added to the test including some electric trucks. The government of Baden-Württemberg has assigned 28.5 million Euros to support EV research up to 2014. Meanwhile, EnBW has sponsored 500 E-Bikes in the Elektronauten project in 2010 which can use 13 charging stations in the Stuttgart region. EnBW has claimed to offer 250 charging stations for the Elektronauten 500 project in May 2011 although the map has not been updated. Bosch has developed a new charging station type for EnBW that is capable for 63A – the station was certified on 11. April 2011 by DEKRA and EnBW has announced to install 260 charge stations in the following weeks for MeRegioMobil project in Stuttgart and Karlsruhe. In November 2011 the car2go project announced to go to Stuttgart in 2012 – EnBW reassured to have 500 charging spots ready in time with the roll out of the car2go vehicles in the second half of 2012.

The German government has announced to support a fleet of 1 million electric cars in Germany by 2020. There are 500 million Euros assigned to the Federal Ministry of Economics and Technology (Germany) to support research and pilot projects in Germany. The ministry has created a dedicated coordination office in the "Gemeinsame Geschäftsstelle Elektromobilität der Bundesregierung (GGEMO)" (Joint Agency for Electric Mobility (of the Federal Government))  which was opened in February 2010. The GGEMO has coordinated a partnership program with the German car industry named "Nationale Plattform Elektromobilität (NPE)" inaugurated on 3 May 2010, in the German Chancellery.

The NPE partnership is supposed to detail the plans for network evolution. The technical standardization part is mostly concentrated in the Deutsche Kommission Elektrotechnik (DKE) of the Association for Electrical, Electronic and Information Technologies (VDE) – the "Standardization Overview on E-Mobility" shows a wide range of efforts from electric grid management to the charging station infrastructure to the car charger electronics. The NPE partnership has published an interim report on 30 November 2010, showing a test fleet of 2800 electric vehicles and 2500 charging stations in 8 test regions.

The German government has announced that it will not install a rebate system for the introduction of electric cars but that it will reshape the legal provisions to quickly create a charging station network in Germany. Bernd Pischetsrieder (formerly Volkswagen) points to studies saying that most of the current buyers of electric cars did already own multiple cars so that a rebate plan would merely come out as a subvention of a consumer class that can afford the expense anyway.

The VDE E-mobility congress on the subject was held in Leipzig on 8./9. November 2010. During the congress a large consumer study was presented that showed some 64 percent want to buy an electric car. The study did also look at the requirements to the charging process – 51 percent of consumers in Germany expect a car to be charged in less than 2 hours, up to 4 hours is acceptable to 60 percent of consumers. 64 percent of consumers expect to charge in their own garage, 21 percent want to frequent a central charging station while casual charging in parking lots of shops and company grounds is expected by a mere 6 and 4 percent respectively. The maximum travel distance shows mixed results – while 53 percent say that 300 km is enough there are also 31 percent who like to travel 450 to 1000 km until required to recharge.

The interim report of the NPE partnership classifies electric vehicles in 3 categories, all-electric city cars, family cars and light trucks with an electric range for city transport. Development is sketched in phases 2010–2013, 2014–2017, 2018–2020 and post-2020 with the government goal to get 1 million electric cars up to 2020 and 6 million electric cars up to 2030 (for comparison there are 44 million cars in Germany in 2010). Batteries are not expected to show great advancements in terms of capacity but the safety will increase and the prices will fall to 250-€300 /kWh in the 2018-2020 time frame. In the post-2020 time frame new battery types are expected – instead of lithium-ion the fourth generation batteries will be introduced to the mobility market including lithium-air, lithium-sulfur and zinc-air batteries. As for charging stations a wide network of fast-charging points is considered possible with 22 kW (400 V 32 A) stations to be introduced in 2010-2013 and 44 kW (400 V 63 A) stations to be introduced in 2014–2017. For the time beyond 2020 there is an expectation of charging stations at 60 kW (400 V DC 150 A) allowing to charge the standard 20kWh battery pack to 80% in less than 10 minutes whereas this station type requires integration with smart grid technology and a strict worldwide standard (including SAE procedures). The "early adoptors" of electric vehicles are identified to be from the middle class owning multiple cars as well as owning a garage – the existence of a public network of charging stations is considered to be not (sic!) a prerequisite for market introduction in the first phases. Instead government funds should back the investments in privately owned charging stations for example with faster tax write off and cheap credits from the government KfW bank.

A preliminary review of the Mercedes / RWE test drive in the smart ed project shows the importance of vehicle-to-grid communications in charging stations as an incentive to charge at night times. While most US households own a garage even for small cars the situation is different in Central Europe where public charging stations are needed.

Switzerland

The charging station network in Switzerland is derived from research in solar cars. In 1992 the government decided to support a charging station network. The network has since extended to neighbouring countries – in 2010 the Park & Charge network in Switzerland, Germany and Austria did encompass 500 charging locations, additionally there a few charging locations in the Netherlands and Italy.

Plug’n Roll: the smart EV charging network in Switzerland.

Iceland

Iceland has two major operators of public electric charging stations, Ísorka and Orka náttúrunnar. At launch, both stations did not charge for electricity at their stations, but Orka náttúrunnar started charging on 1 February 2018 and Ísorka started charging on 18 August 2017. A payment card is needed from these vendors to use their stations.  there are 31 stations from Orka náttúrunnar,  there are 408 stations from Ísorka and  there are 23 towns and hotels with independent public charging stations.

Ireland

In 2009–2010 the Irish Government, and electric utility Electricity Supply Board (ESB) entered into tripartite agreements with major electric vehicle manufacturers (Renault–Nissan
,
Mitsubishi Motors
,
Toyota
, and
PSA Peugeot Citroën
) to promote the uptake of electric vehicles in Ireland.

The Irish government has instituted a package of measures, including a €5,000 grant (US$7,158) to assist with purchasing the vehicle, exemption from vehicle registration tax, and accelerated capital allowances to promote electric vehicle purchase.
In 2013, the Irish government withdrew the EV vehicle registration tax exemption and replaced it with a €5,000 discount on the tax. New conditions were also added to the SEAI EV Grant which reclassified private EV purchases via Hire Purchase or car loan as a commercial purchase, effectively reducing the EV grant to €3,500 for all non-cash buyers. As a result of these changes, EV sales fell in 2013 to only 58 units.

ESB is providing the charging network, which will be made up of 46 fast-charging (50 kW DC) stations located at intervals on inter-urban national primary routes, 1,500 medium-speed(22 kW AC) public charging points distributed across all towns with population over 1500, and home chargers (3.6 kW 1Φ, 16A) at no cost to the first 2,000 grant qualifying electric car owners.

The first station of the charger network was commissioned in August 2010. At the end of 2011 the charging station map shows 50 AC charging places plus 10 DC stations – the AC chargers will be built to Type 2 sockets however some older charging spots still need to be rebuilt. As of 2014 all 46 CHAdeMO fast chargers are operational and are slowly being replaced by tri-standard units capable of CHAdeMO, CCS and 44 kW AC power.

Analysis of the charge station network as of 2016 showed that the installed network coverage was extensive but weak with respect to fault resilience.

Luxembourg

There is a national network of accelerated charging stations under the brand name of Chargy. A network of fast chargers is being constructed under the name of SuperChargy.

The Netherlands

In 2009 the City of Amsterdam announced it will set up 200 charging stations by 2012. In the first step the city will put up 100 stations from Coulomb Technologies in cooperation with Dutch utility Nuon and grid company Alliander. The project "Amsterdam Elektrisch" project includes 100 street-side charging stations plus 100 charging stations at car parks The first one was put up on 6. November 2009, the 100th street-side charging station became operational on 4. March 2011, with also over 100 charging stations at car parks. In April 2011, the City of Amsterdam announced the expansion of the street-side charging network with another 1000 charging stations, to be installed by Essent and a joint venture of Nuon and Heijmans.

The Dutch government created the "Formula E Team," a working group collaborating with local governments, private companies and research institutes to create national and regional electric vehicle initiatives. The Foundation E-Laad.nl has the ambitious plan to put up 10,000 charging points by 2012. The Dutch government and the regional grid companies help Foundation E-laad.nl to put up a charging station network adding 65 million Euro investment support in the timeframe 2009 to 2011. The point of 500 charging stations (distributed over 125 communities) was reached on 24. June. The point of 1000 charging stations was reached on 8. December 2011, 1500 on 2. May 2012. and 2500 on 22. August 2013.

According to the roadmap of Formula E-Team the office has been created and the first RFI has started in August 2010; the results will be published in early November for comments and proposals with a definite guide for the infrastructure to be published in March 2011. The integration tests will run in mid of 2011 and the back office system for the networked charging stations to go live in late 2011 along with the "Charge Authority Board" for further development. On 19. July 2010 the Formula E-Team has resolved that charge points in the Netherlands will be equipped with Type 2 Mode 3 sockets, based on a decision by providers from 9. April 2010 that will replace the earlier 5-pin CEE red sockets.

The Netherlands is one of the first European markets for the Nissan Leaf;
It is also the first European country to adopt stations for the "level 3" fast-charging supported by the Leaf. Epyon has unveiled the first charging station at a gasoline station in Leeuwarden, in the northern province of Friesland.

Poland

RWE and the "Green Stream Cluster" have started in June 2010 to put up a network of 130 charging stations in Warsaw. The Grean Stream Cluster project will run until mid of 2011. The Green Stream Cluster will put up overall 330 charging stations in five cities: Warsaw, Gdansk, Katowice, Kraków and Mielec. "Ekoenergetyka-Zachod" works on an electric vehicle network in the western cities of Zielona Gora (Grünberg), Sulechow, Pila (Schneidemühl) und Sieradz.

Portugal

Renault–Nissan have signed a contract with MOBIE.Tech that was started back in 2008. There shall be 1300 new charging stations and 50 fastcharge stations within the 2011 timeframe.

The government wants to enlarge to renewable energy sector up to 60% and usage of electric vehicles is considered an important strategy to cut dependency on imports. The MOBI.E network has installed 100 charging stations and it is deploying 1300 charging stations as well as 50 fast-charge stations in 25 cities up to June 2011. The MOBI.E stations work with magnetic stripe card and bills are sent to the cell phone – the government hopes to export the concept to other countries.

Slovenia

An overview of available charging stations is provided by polni.si, the biggest providers are Dravske Elektrarne Maribor, Elektro Celje,  Elektro Gorenjska,  Elektro Ljubljana,  Elektro Maribor, Elektro Primorska and Petrol. The municipal works Elektro Ljubljana provides a number of public charging stations in the elektro-crpalke network based on 400 V/32 A type or the domestic socket type (Schuko).

Spain

The Alargador map has 190 (August 2010) contributors of charging stations in Spain and Portugal (May 2010). They are mainly hotels, camping sites, restaurants, commercial centers, foundations, associations, EV dealers and private individuals with most systems operated manually.

In Madrid, Spain, a trial project will convert 30 former telephone boxes into charging points for electric cars. They are considered suitable, since telephone boxes are generally located at the roadside and are already connected to the electricity supply network. They would form part of a planned network of 546 charging points in Madrid, Barcelona and Seville, subsidised by the Spanish Government. The charging grid is created for the MOVELE pilot project of the Institute for Diversification and Saving of Energy (Instituto para la Diversificación y Ahorro de la Energía, IDAE) that is also providing for 2,000 electric vehicles to the field test. The Spanish government has committed itself to have 1 million electric vehicles (fully electric and hybrid cars) in Spain by 2014.

The Chairman of Endesa, Borja Prado, together with a former mayor of Madrid, Alberto Ruiz Gallardón, and the Chairman of Telefónica, César Alierta, have the phone booth in Madrid which can also be used for recharging electric vehicles. Reserved parking spaces will be located next to this and all other booths set up in Metropolitan areas where users will be able to park their EVs and recharge at no cost once they have obtained their free "zero emissions" pre-paid card from the Madrid city council.

The "Live Barcelona" map (sponsored by the Barcelona city council, the Energy state department of Catalonia, utility Endesa, car maker Seat) lists 138 charging spots in Barcelona with 55 of them functional (February 2011).

In September 2011 Endesa signed agreements with Mitsubishi, Renault–Nissan and the Japanese Chademo Foundation on the promotion of fast-charge stations. Endesa will hold the Chademo Europe chair. As a consequence, Endesa will deploy two types of public charging spots – conventional charging (16 A, 230 V AC, Schuko type)  and rapid charging (125 A, 400 V DC, Chademo type). In October 2011 Endesa ordered 53 rapid charging stations to be built by GE in strategic places in Spain.

The Galicia region is creating a research cluster (Clúster de Empresas de Automoción de Galicia / Ceaga). The infrastructure side (Plan Mobega – Plan de movilidad eléctrica de Galicia) includes the implementation of a network of multifunctional electromobility stations located at rent-a-car stations. The current installation includes 7 Multifunctional Electromobility stations which are located in the main metropolitan areas of Galicia and a fleet of 28 electric vehicles. The project was started in September 2011 and will continue until Enero 2013.

United Kingdom

Électricité de France is partnering with Elektromotive, Ltd. to install 250 new charging points over six months from October 2007 in London and elsewhere in the UK. By November 2011 there are 687 Electrobay charging stations (200 in London) and it plans to build 4000 charging points throughout 2012. Elektromotive has provided 400 public access charge points to the "Charge your Car" network of One NorthEast in 2010 and it has installed more than 120 charge points across Scotland.

The Renault–Nissan Alliance and UK company Elektromotive, a provider of electric vehicle recharging stations, are collaborating in the Partnership for Zero-Emission-Mobility, with the aim of accelerating the installation of charging networks for plug-in vehicles in cities. The Alliance and Elektromotive have signed a Memorandum of Understanding.

A fleet of electric cars and charge points will be rolled out across Coventry (England) as part of a multimillion-pound pilot project.

The Department for Transport (DfT) announced in April 2009 that £230 million would be allocated to incentivise the market uptake of EVs in the UK. The scheme will become operational in 2011 and each EV purchaser could receive a rebate of between £2,000 -£5,000. Electric vehicles are exempt from purchase and annual vehicle tax. From April 2010, purchasers of an average new car (Band G) will pay a one off £155 showroom tax and an annual vehicle tax of £155.EVs are tax free.

On 25 February 2010, London, the North East region and Milton Keynes were selected to be the lead places for electric vehicle infrastructure. In total, their plans will result in over 2,500 charge points in the first year and over 11,000 in the next three years, at a variety of publicly accessible car parks, transport hubs and workplaces.

The London mayor called for an E-revolution in March 2009 and he presented the "Electric Delivery Plan for London" in May 2009. The plan projects 25,000 charging points London by 2015 including 500 on-street, 2000 off-street in car-parks and 22,000 privately owned locations. London itself will buy 1000 electric vehicles up to 2015. Owners of an electric car will not need to pay the Congestion Charge for the city of London being worth up to £1,700 a year. At that point (May 2009) London already had 100 charge points in public places which will be increased to 250 by 2012. Beginning 2011 20% of new lots in car parks must have access to a charging outlet. Additionally, the parking in the Westminster boroughs will be free for electric vehicles saving the user up to £6,000 a year and a flat rate of £200 electricity cost is charged for the usage of public outlets in Westminster.

As of February 2011 the "Source London" project has contracted Siemens to build a network of public charging stations in London. At least 1,300 charging points will be installed by the end of 2013 in public locations and streets across the Capital. Transport for London (TfL) has also finalised a contract that will see Siemens manage the operation of the network and registration of drivers. The deal between TfL and Siemens will see Siemens run the Source London back office to March 2014 at no cost. Up to July 2011 there were 180 charging stations. and in November 2011 more than 200. The number of charging stations reached 790 in October 2012 with plans to increase that to 1300 in 2013. The goal of 1300 publicly accessible charging stations was met on 16 May 2013.

In July 2011 a charity called Zero Carbon World announced their Charge Points Everywhere network, their aim is to help business's install free to use charge points on their business's with the implicit understanding the person using the charge point will use the services of that business. The connections themselves are standard 32 and 13amp connectors and the inclusion of the 32amp connector means that car with powerful chargers such as Tesla can charge much faster than with the 13a connectors on the majority of chargers On 15 February 2012, the alliance announce to donate 1000 charging stations for free adding up on the existing 76 charging stations that are already deployed.

The "Plugged-In Places" program of the Department of Transport offers grants for charging station networks in the United Kingdom. The development plan identifies 8 regions to be in a strategic focus – Central Scotland, the East of England, Greater Manchester, Milton Keynes, the North East of England and Northern Ireland – with a target of 8500 chargepoints. Following the ACEA position paper the government program favours moving to a dedicated recharging connector of Type 2 Mode 3. Referring to the PIP program an open tender in Newcastle upon Tyne identifies the goal to have 75% of the charging stations to offer Type 2 Mode 3 sockets including to switch over existing charging stations to that type.

The UK has limited electric vehicle charging network roaming providers. Paua and AllStar provides this service for businesses.

North America

United States

Infrastructure has been installed by Coulomb Technologies in Arizona; California – San Francisco, San Jose, Walnut Creek, and Sonoma; Colorado; Washington, D.C.; Florida; Chicago, Illinois; Massachusetts; Detroit, Michigan; Minneapolis, Minnesota; New York City; Cary, North Carolina; Ohio; Portland, Oregon; Nashville, Tennessee; Texas; Seattle, Washington; Wisconsin.
Gilbarco Veeder-Root are partnering with Coulomb to advance public charging facilities. Gilbarco exhibited Coulomb Technologies' Smartlet Charging Station at the National Association of Convenience Stores (NACS) show in October 2008.
At the end of 2008, Coulomb Technologies planned to roll out five curbside charging stations in downtown San Jose that drivers can access through a prepaid plan. The company was working with entities in Las Vegas Nevada, New York and Florida to do something similar there. Coulomb Technologies has announced to provide 1000 free public charging stations until December 2010. They also plan to expand its "ChargePoint America network" to 4600 free home and public level-2 charging stations until October 2011 in nine regions: Austin, Texas; Detroit, Michigan; Los Angeles, California; New York, New York; Orlando, Florida; Sacramento, California; the San Jose/San Francisco Bay Area, California; Redmond, Washington; and Washington DC. The $37 million ChargePoint America program is made possible by a $15M grant funded by the American Recovery and Reinvestment Act through the Transportation Electrification Initiative administered by the Department of Energy. So far 149 stations are operational according to the ChargePoint map, 51 stations are in California. New York joins the ChargePoint network building more than 100 charging stations in public places until October 2011. In April 2012 the first milestone of the Chargepoint America program has been reached with Colulomb Technologies having delivered 2400 public and commercial charging stations, the actual installation of its Level 2 (240 V 30 A) stations in the 10 participating regions will continue.

Infrastructure is planned by Better Place for Hawaii, Oregon, and California – the San Francisco Bay area, Sacramento, San Jose, Los Angeles, San Diego, and the highway and freeway corridors between them.

Other companies that are building charging stations throughout the U.S. are ECOtality  and SolarCity

In the initial phase of "The EV Project" of ECOtality there are 11 participating cities: Phoenix (AZ), Tucson (AZ), San Diego (CA), Portland (OR), Eugene (OR), Salem (OR), Corvallis (OR), Seattle (WA), Nashville (TN), Knoxville (TN) and Chattanooga (TN). The contract for the "EV Project" was signed on 1 October 2009, with the US Department of Energy and it includes 8,300 Level 2 chargers installed in owner's homes; 6,350 Level 2 chargers installed in commercial and public locations; and 310 Level 3 DC fast-chargers. The EV project will run for 36 months. The public charging stations will be put up beginning in summer 2010. Texas has joined the EV Project in July 2010. San Diego will take a share of 1,500 public charging stations and 1,000 home base charging points. The first milestone of The EV Project has been reached in April 2012.

Portland General Electric installs 12 electric vehicle charging stations in Portland and Salem, Oregon until September 2008 and it has installed 20 charging stations by 2010 as part of a demonstration project to develop the transportation infrastructure needed to support electric vehicles and plug-in cars.

NRG Energy has announced to create a network of 50 charging stations in northern Texas under the "EVgo" brand. In March 2012 the company announced to build a network of 200 fast-charging stations in California over the next four years. By 30 Dec. 2015 EVgo has installed over 1,000 chargers in over 25 markets.  NRG EVgo has developed partnerships to build infrastructure and offer complimentary charging with Nissan, BMW and Ford.

In Virginia, with the participation of the Town of Wytheville, and several businesses, Plugless Power inductive charging stations began field testing in March 2010. South Carolina has unveiled its "Plug in Carolina" program including 100 public charging stations in December 2010 In San Antonio, TX, a downtown church (Travis Park United Methodist Church) made Level 1 charging available in its parking lot in 2009.

The DBEDT ministry of Hawaii had a state rebate program "EV Ready Grant" that was funded by the American Recovery and Reinvestment Act – the program was offering $4500 for a full-speed commercially available electric vehicle and $500 for electric vehicle chargers. The "EV Ready Grant" program is followed by the "EV Ready Rebate" program offering 20% of the purchase price with a maximum of $4500 for a full-speed commercially available electric vehicle and 30% of the purchase prices with a maximum of $500 for electric vehicle chargers. Charging equipment is expected follow the standards including SAE J1772. The designated Transportation Working Group expects 200 charging stations to be available in 2010 In February 2012 it was announced to have Betterplace activate its multi-island network of 130 charging stations (Oahu, Maui, Kauai and the Big Island). The Hawaii rebate program is being continued with having reached a score of 372 funded vehicles and 246 chargers, and by April 2012 approximately 220 charging stations have been installed as part of the EV Ready Grant Program. The Hawaii station database lists the 200 public charging stations in 80 locations that were available up to March 2012, about 140 have been installed by BetterPlace.

In California the car maker Tesla has put up 18 public charging stations. Within the SF Bay Area Activities & Coalition has identified 109 locations to put up public charging stations beginning 2009 based on funding by ARRA. The last California "ZEV Program Review symposium" was held on 23. September 2009, the next one is scheduled for late summer 2010. In the past there had been a charging station network to support the General Motors EV1 that had installed 500 public charging station.

The U.S. Department of Energy offers a list of locations of the available alternative fuel infrastructure. The historic trend summary (1992–2010) shows a total of 541 electric charging locations by 2010 which had been still lower than the peak count of 873 charging locations in 2002.  the total count of public electric charge stations in the United States had increased to 27,458.

Electrify America operates one of the largest public electric vehicle DC fast charging networks in the United States, with more than 500 charging locations and over 2,200 individual charging units, as of 2020. The company expects to install or have under development approximately 800 stations with about 3,500 DC fast chargers by December 2021.

Canada

In 2012, a series of free public electric vehicle charging stations were installed along the main route of the Trans-Canada Highway by a private company, Sun Country Highway, permitting electric vehicle travel across the entire length, as demonstrated by the company's president in a publicity trip in a Tesla Roadster.  this made it the longest electric vehicle ready highway in the world.  The same company also partnered with Canadian rural hardware retailer Peavey Mart to add free public charging stations to its 29 stores across Western Canada and includes chargers located at Best Western hotels in Canada and the US on its online map of EV charging stations.   the company's total network was over 700 chargers with plans to reach 1000 chargers by year end.

From 2011 to 2014, the City of Vancouver installed 
publicly accessible Level 2 charging stations in a variety of locations, including community centres, shopping malls, curbside, and other locations throughout the city.
In 2008, the city changed the Building Bylaw to require 20% of parking stalls in apartments and condos, and all stalls in houses to be electric vehicle ready.
In 2013, the bylaw was updated so that 10% of stalls in mixed-use and commercial buildings are also ready for electric vehicles.

In a March 2016 news release,
the Government of British Columbia stated that the 
CEV Program
investments have supported over 550 public Level 2 charging stations, and 30 DC fast charging stations.

South America

Brazil
As of 2022, Brazil had around 1,250 stations, with 47% stations concentrated in the state of São Paulo

Uruguay
In January 2016, UTE opened the first charging station in Montevideo, exclusive for taxis.

In December 2017, UTE and Ancap opened a charging station network that connects Colonia del Sacramento, Rosario, Puntas de Valdez, Montevideo, San Luis and Punta del Este, with stations every 65 km. The stations at the Carrasco Airport and Colonia have 43 kW, whereas the other stations have 22 kW.

Asia

China

China's first large electric charging station for electric vehicles—the Tangshan Nanhu EV Charging Station – was put into service on 31 March 2010. Five cities in northern Hebei province – Tangshan, Zhangjiakou, Qinhuangdao, Langfang and Chengde – want to build three charging stations and 100 charging poles in 2010.

Shandong is the province with most car manufacturers in China. The province planned to start in May 2010 with a charging station for 45 cars. According to China's State Grid Corporation, 75 electric vehicle charging stations are planned in 27 cities across China by the end of 2010. Additionally 6,209 charging posts and some battery replacement stations had been planned for 2010. The State Grid Corporation China announced success in distributing 7,031 charge poles in Hangzhou-Jinhua and wants to add 211 additional charging poles in 2011 along with 173 charging stations.

China is planning on installing 10 million electric vehicle charging stations by 2020. In the 12th Five Year Plan (2011–2015) China wants to deploy 2,351 charge and replacement power stations and 220,000 charge spots. The reason is to get rid of crude oil imports which makes for 54 percent of the oil usage and cars accounted for 40 percent of national oil consumption (2010).

Japan
Infrastructure is planned by Better Place and Nissan for Yokohama.

Singapore
Infrastructure is planned by Robert Bosch and Keppel Energy for Singapore

Middle East

Israel 

Israel has enacted policies that create a tax differential between zero-emission vehicles and traditional cars, to accelerate the transition to electric cars.

Better Place began to build its first electric vehicle network in Israel in conjunction with French car-maker, Renault. The company conducted its first market tests in Israel, Denmark and Hawaii because their small size also made them suitable as test markets. Better Place opened its first functional charging station in Israel the first week of December 2008 at Cinema City in Pi-Glilot, and additional stations were planned in Tel Aviv, Haifa, Kfar Saba, Holon, and Jerusalem.

In March 2011 Better Place presented a detailed plan for network construction, including 40 battery swap stations and 400 charging stations across Israel. 200 locations were said to be under construction or planned at the end of 2011, but that goal was not reached. On 26 May 2013, Better Place filed for bankruptcy in Israel, having terminated its projects in most markets.

Gnrgy, originally a producer of mobile charging solutions, entered the market as an alternative to Betterplace. On 29 February 2012 it partnered with Pango, provider of parking billing solutions, to set up a series of charging stations throughout Israel.

Oceania

Australia

Australia currently has thirteen electric vehicle charging stations across Sydney, Melbourne and Canberra from Coulomb Technologies. They opened in 2010 and 2011. One charge point from ECOtality has been installed in the car park at 140 William Street in Melbourne CBD with Exigency providing project management and metering. ChargePoint has expanded its service to eight cities by 2012 (Perth 3, Adelaide 5, Melbourne 10, Canberra 2, Sydney 8, Brisbane 6, Townsville 3, Hobart 1).

Construction of infrastructure (charging spots and battery switching stations) had been proposed by Better Place for the major cities Melbourne, Sydney and Brisbane.
Australia would have become the third country in the world to have an electric car network in a bid to run the country's 15 million cars on batteries powered by green energy under a plan announced in October 2008.  Better Place filed for bankruptcy in Israel on 25 May, shortly after pulling out of Australia.
The original plan to deploy as much as 200,000 charging stations was stopped in January 2013, after just 20 public charge spots had been installed.

In May 2011  has completed a fast recharge network in test city Perth. In the test drive the European connectors have been preferred over the American connectors since Australia (like Europe) does have three-phase power (at 415 V) in most home locations. The fast-charge outlets connect with a special 8-pin IEC-compatible round connector integrating single-phase and three-phase power The project of the University of Western Australia was continued with 23 public charging stations available by September 2012 featuring Type 2 connectors at 32 A.

United States EV manufacturer Tesla Motors formally launched in Australia in December 2014, announcing their intention to build their supercharger network along the highway between Melbourne, Canberra and Sydney by the end of 2015, and extending to Brisbane by the end of 2016.

See also

Better Place
Charging station
Coulomb Technologies
SemaConnect
 Tesla Supercharger

References

Electric vehicles
Transport in Australia
Transport in Denmark
Transport in Japan
Transport infrastructure
Transport in Canada
Transport in Spain
Road transport in Portugal